Devil Got My Woman is the fourth studio album by American blues singer Skip James, released in 1968. It was his last record before his death in 1969. The title track is featured in the 2001 film Ghost World.

Reception

AllMusic critic Scott Yanow wrote: "One can easily hear the influence that Skip James' music had on the then flourishing folk music movement, and he still sang his country blues with great intensity."

Track listing

Personnel
Skip James – vocals, guitar, piano

References

1968 albums
Skip James albums
Vanguard Records albums